Echium leucophaeum is a species of flowering plants of the family Boraginaceae. It is endemic to the Canary Islands, where it is restricted to the island of Tenerife. Its name in Spanish is taginaste de Anaga. The specific name leucophaeum is from Greek and means "greyish white".

Description
It is a strongly branching woody shrub, average height , maximum height . The leaves are leathery and lance-shaped. Its flowers are white to rosy white and sit in a medium-sized inflorescence.

References

leucophaeum
Flora of Tenerife
Endemic flora of the Canary Islands